was a Japanese scholar of kokugaku. He was also a Shinto priest.

Biography 
Little is known of his early life and childhood.

In 1855, he absconded from his domain and travelled to Edo in order to study under the mitogaku theorist . Around that time, he formally became a disciple of the kokugaku theologian , heir to the legacy of Hirata Atsutane.

When Sawa was appointed governor-general of Northern Japan within the revolutionary Imperial Army, Tsunoda served as liaison with the Kubota Domain and was involved in that domain's defection from the shogunate.

Alongside many other Hirata disciples, Tsunoda attempted to enter into political service after the conclusion of the war. However, the progressive establishment, fearing that Hirata primitivism would obstruct the national modernization program, sought to expel Hirata influence from the government. As a result of this, Tsunoda was dispatched to serve as a provincial shrine priest and thereby removed from direct involvement in national affairs.

Shrines to which he was attached included Hirota, Shimogamo, and finally Atsuta Shrine where he served as high priest. He served in that capacity until his retirement in 1914.

To the end of his life Tsunoda despised all things Western, and made a point of never donning a single piece of Western attire. Only once, on the occasion of an audience with the Emperor, was an exception made.

Legacy 
Tsunoda, under the fictional name , is a major character depicted in Shimazaki Tōson's epic novel Before the Dawn, first published in 1929.

Selected works

Bibliography

References 

1834 births
1918 deaths
Kokugaku scholars
People from Nagano Prefecture
Japanese priests
Japanese Shintoists
Japanese writers of the Edo period
Writers from Nagano Prefecture
People of the Boshin War
Japanese nationalists
Meiji Restoration